Yevgeniy Vasilyevich Fedorov (born 16 February 2000) is a Kazakh professional cyclist, who currently rides for UCI WorldTeam .

Major results

2017
 National Junior Road Championships
1st  Road race
6th Time trial
 4th Road race, Asian Junior Road Championships
 4th Overall Tour de DMZ
1st Stage 4 
 6th Overall Tour du Pays de Vaud
 9th Road race, UCI Junior Road World Championships
2018
 Summer Youth Olympics
1st  Combined team 
6th Criterium
8th Road race
 1st  Time trial, National Junior Road Championships
 3rd Overall Tour de DMZ
1st  Mountains classification
1st Stage 3
 6th Overall Tour de Gironde
 9th Overall Trophée Centre Morbihan
2019
 Asian Under-23 Road Championships
1st  Time trial
2nd  Road race
 1st  Mountains classification, Tour of Almaty
2020
 1st Stage 1 Tour du Rwanda
 2nd Overall Tour de Langkawi
1st Stage 1 
 7th Overall Tour of Szeklerland
1st Stage 1
2021
 National Road Championships
1st  Road race
2nd Time trial
2022
 1st  Road race, UCI Road World Under-23 Championships
 Asian Road Championships
1st  Team time trial
1st  Time trial
 2nd Piccolo Giro di Lombardia
 5th UCI World Gravel Championships

Grand Tour general classification results timeline

References

External links

 
 

2000 births
Living people
Kazakhstani male cyclists
Cyclists at the 2018 Summer Youth Olympics
Youth Olympic gold medalists for Kazakhstan
People from Aktobe
Kazakhstani people of Russian descent
21st-century Kazakhstani people